Blow by Blow is a weekly sports television boxing program produced by Vintage Sports and aired over television network PTV and later IBC.  Debuting in 1994, it focuses mainly on up-and-coming boxing prospects. The show ended in 1999.

History
The show is usually taped on small venues and gyms across Metro Manila (usually from Parañaque or Mandaluyong).

The show is noted for airing the early bouts of Manny Pacquiao, who quickly became one of its featured boxers.

Revival
The show was revived on December 13, 2015, and aired every Sunday afternoon on TV5. Pacquiao, one of the homegrown boxers featured in Blow by Blow, together with Sports5, former North Cotabato vice governor and acclaimed boxing analyst Manny Piñol, and boxing promoters Gerry Garcia and Lito Mondejar spearheaded the return of the program that will feature boxing fights of amateur boxers in the country.

Notable incidents

Eugene Barutag incident
On December 9, 1995, a young fighter from General Santos City named Eugene Barutag, was scheduled for an eight-round match against veteran Randy Andagan of Biñan, Laguna. Barutag was winning the match in the first four rounds and almost knocked out Andagan, but the latter got his second wind and beat the younger boxer, who at the end of the bout, collapsed in his corner. At that time, there were no standby paramedics in case of emergency. Using the service vehicle of Vintage Sports, Barutag was rushed to the Jose Reyes Memorial Hospital and was declared dead on arrival.

The bout was shown on an i-Witness episode entitled Kamao (fist). The episode won a Peabody Award, together with two other documentaries that the program produced.

The fight also features in the 2015 Movie, Kid Kulafu, where Manny Pacquiao witnesses his death.

Presenters
Bobby Mondejar (ring announcer)
Ed Picson
Quinito Henson
Ronnie Nathanielsz
Chino Trinidad
Romy Kintanar

See also
Vintage Television
Manny Pacquiao
List of programs aired by People's Television Network
List of programs previously broadcast by Intercontinental Broadcasting Corporation
List of programs aired by TV5 (Philippine TV network)

References

Boxing television series
1990s Philippine television series
1994 Philippine television series debuts
1999 Philippine television series endings
People's Television Network original programming
Intercontinental Broadcasting Corporation original programming
TV5 (Philippine TV network) original programming
Filipino-language television shows